Abacetus katanganus is a species of ground beetle in the subfamily Pterostichinae. It was described by Burgeon in 1934.

References

katanganus
Beetles described in 1934